Ayussinte Pusthakam (transl. The Book of Passing Shadows), is a well-known Indian Malayalam language novel by C. V. Balakrishnan.

Development

Writing 
Balakrishnan began writing this novel when he moved to Calcutta in late-1970s. An old edition of the Bible at St. Paul's Cathedral in Calcutta triggered the book in him. It took him three years to complete the novel. Says the author: "All the characters and villages of Christian settlers were in my mind long before I began thinking about writing Ayussinte Pusthakam. The characters are based on people I met during my course as a school teacher in a village in Kasaragod. I wrote Ayussinte Pusthakam at a time when I was going through an emotionally difficult period; my relation with my father was strained and I was feeling very lonely. Ayussinte Pusthakam is about loneliness. The book is also about sin and sadness, written in a style and language that have been judiciously borrowed from The Bible." The protagonist in this novel is Yohannan, and the plot revolves around his ambiguities concerning sexual desire.

Translations 
Ayussinte Pusthakam has been translated into Tamil and English since its publication in 1984. Following is a list containing information about the translated works.

English translation 
The book was translated from Malayalam into English by T.M. Yesudasan, a former associate professor and head, Department of English, CMS College Kottayam. He has contributed to journals and anthologies on literary and cultural studies including the Penguin collection, No Alphabet in Sight: New Dalit Writing from South India.

Adaptations

Drama
The novel was adapted into an experimental play by Suveeran. The play received Kerala Sangeeta Nataka Akademi Award of 2008, and participated in several international festivals.

References 

2009 Indian novels
Indian plays
Malayalam novels